The 2023 Rhein Fire season is the second season of the new Rhein Fire team in the European League of Football from Düsseldorf, Germany. The franchise is building upon a solid previous season, missing the play-offs slightly. For this season, the Fire will compete in the new Western Conference with its rivals Cologne Centurions and Frankfurt Galaxy.

Preseason
After the 2022 post-season, the franchise announced the departure of former general manager Patricia Klemm due to personal reasons and presented Tom Aust, former public relations manager of the old Rhein Fire. Another big change in the coaching staff was the hire of the former Barcelona Dragons head coach Andrew Weidinger as the new offensive coordinator.

Regular season

Standings

Schedule

Roster

Transactions
From Cologne Centurions: Max Richter, Flamur Simon, Marius Kensy, Jannik Lörcks

From Barcelona Dragons: Alejandro Fernández

From Stuttgart Surge: Benjamin Barnes

Staff

Notes

References 

Rhein Fire (ELF)
Rhein Fire
Rhein Fire